Pagliari is an Italian surname. Notable people with the surname include:

Dino Pagliari (born 1957), Italian footballer and manager
Giovanni Battista Pagliari (1741–1816), Italian painter and art restorer
Renato Pagliari (1940–2009), Italian singer
Rubén Pagliari (born 1927), Argentine basketball player

Italian-language surnames